Birendra Basak (born 1 February 1912, date of death unknown) was an Indian water polo player. He competed in the men's tournament at the 1952 Summer Olympics.

References

1912 births
Year of death missing
Indian male water polo players
Olympic water polo players of India
Water polo players at the 1952 Summer Olympics
Place of birth missing